Peck is an unincorporated community on the Sedgwick and Sumner County border in Kansas, United States.  As of the 2020 census, the population of the community and nearby areas was 162.  It is located about 2 miles west of the Kansas Star Casino at Meridian Ave and 119th St S, next the Union Pacific Railroad.

History

19th century
In 1887, the Chicago, Kansas and Nebraska Railway built a branch line north–south from Herington through Peck to Caldwell.  It foreclosed in 1891 and was taken over by Chicago, Rock Island and Pacific Railway, which shut down in 1980 and reorganized as Oklahoma, Kansas and Texas Railroad, merged in 1988 with Missouri Pacific Railroad, merged in 1997 with Union Pacific Railroad.  Most locals still refer to this railroad as the "Rock Island".

The first post office in Peck was established in October 1887. The town was named for George Peck, who owned a hotel there.

Geography

Climate
The climate in this area is characterized by hot, humid summers and generally mild to cool winters.  According to the Köppen Climate Classification system, Peck has a humid subtropical climate, abbreviated "Cfa" on climate maps.

Demographics

For statistical purposes, the United States Census Bureau has defined Peck as a census-designated place (CDP).

Education
The community is served by Mulvane USD 263 public school district.

References

Further reading

External links
 Sumner County map, KDOT

 

Unincorporated communities in Sedgwick County, Kansas
Unincorporated communities in Kansas
Wichita, KS Metropolitan Statistical Area